The East Side, as the name implies, is a neighborhood in the eastern section of the New York State city of Binghamton. It is primarily an urban residential neighborhood with retail along Court and Robinson streets and pockets of industry scattered along the train tracks.

The East Side can be defined as encompassing the area north of the Susquehanna River, east of the Brandywine Highway (NY-7), downtown and the North Side, west of the town of Kirkwood and south of the Quickway, (NY-17)/(I-81).

The area's "main drag" is Court Street which runs just north of the Norfolk Southern tracks and the Susquehanna River. It connects the Eastside directly to Downtown Binghamton and Kirkwood. The New York State Inebriate Asylum is located just west of the Kirkwood Town Line at the foot of Robinson Street.

The Cameo Theater is a New York State landmark located on Robinson Street on the East Side.

External links
 East Side Parking & Street Map

Neighborhoods in Binghamton, New York